The Leibniz Review is a peer-reviewed academic journal devoted to scholarly examination of Gottfried Leibniz’s thought and work. It publishes contemporary articles and reviews, as well as original Leibniz texts. The Leibniz Review is sponsored by the Leibniz Society of North America and edited at Ohio State University in Mansfield, Ohio. Subscriptions and access are provided by the Philosophy Documentation Center.

Abstracting and indexing 
The journal is abstracted and indexed in the International Bibliography of Periodical Literature, the Leibniz-Bibliographie, The Philosopher's Index, PhilPapers, and Scopus.

See also 
 List of philosophy journals

References

External links 
 

Annual journals
English-language journals
Publications established in 1991
Gottfried Wilhelm Leibniz
Contemporary philosophical literature
Leibniz, Gottfried
Philosophy Documentation Center academic journals